The 2016 Sultan Azlan Shah Cup was the 25th edition of the Sultan Azlan Shah Cup. It was held in Ipoh, Perak, Malaysia from 6–16 April 2016.

Australia won the title for the ninth time after defeating India 4–0 in final.

Participating nations
Seven countries are participating in this year's tournament:

Umpires

Peter Wright (RSA)
Lim Hong Zhen (SIN)
Nazmi Kamarudin (MAS)
Michihiko Watanabe (JPN)
Deric Leung (CAN)
Javed Shaikh (IND)
Simon Taylor (NZL)
Murray Grime (AUS)
Hafiz Atif Latif (PAK)

Results
All times are Malaysia Standard Time (UTC+08:00)

Pool

Classification

Fifth and sixth place

Third and fourth place

Final

Final standings

References

External links
Official website
Official FIH website

2016
2016 in field hockey
2016 in Malaysian sport
2016 in Australian field hockey
2016 in Canadian sports
2016 in New Zealand sport
2016 in Pakistani sport
2016 in Indian sport
2016 in Japanese sport
April 2016 sports events in Asia